Harutaeographa shui is a moth of the family Noctuidae. It is found in China (Sichuan), on the eastern edge of Tibetan Plateau. The habitat consists of mountain virgin mixed forests dominated by various broad-leaved trees, rhododendrons and bamboos.

The forewings are richly decorated with dark coppery-brown patterns distinctly marked with black scales. The outer margin and cilia are lighter golden yellow. The hindwings have an intensive dark suffusion, which is especially wide on the outer margin, the discal spot and the well-marked postmedial fascia.

Etymology
The specific name refers to the Shu (state), which is now Chengdu, the capital of China's Sichuan province.

References

External links

Moths described in 2012
Endemic fauna of Sichuan
Orthosiini